Zuljanah, also spelled Zoljanah (and with a host of other spellings appearing sporadically), is an Iranian Satellite Launch Vehicle (SLV), made by the Ministry of Defence and Armed Forces Logistics (Iran), which was unveiled on 1 February 2021, and was launched (at an unknown time before 1 February 2021, possibly 31 January 2021) into sub-orbital flight (apogee 500km) for testing and telemetry purposes. Zuljanah is able to carry satellites weighing up to 220kg into an orbit 500 kilometers above the Earth.

According to Seyed Ahmad Husseini, the space spokesman of the Ministry of Defense : The Zuljanah SLV is part of a larger project called "Hazrat Fatemeh Al-Zahra" (Persian: حضرت فاطمه الزهراء). This SLV is considered to be the first indigenously designed and manufactured hybrid fuel satellite launch vehicle (solid/liquid fuel). As of June 2022, two more test flights are planned.

Design 
Zuljanah measures 25.5 meters (84ft) in length, and has a mass of 52 tons (115,000lbs). The first and second stages utilize an identical 1.5m diameter solid-fuel engine with 74 tons (725kN; 163,000lbf) of thrust and a Safir type 1.25m diameter liquid-fuel (UDMH /N2O4) engine with a thrust of 3.5 tons (35 kN; 7,800 lbf) as a third stage. Zuljanah is capable of carrying a single satellite weighing up to 220kg or a constellation of ten smaller 20kg cubesats to Low-Earth Orbit.

Zuljanah is the third civilian Satellite Launch Vehicle made in Iran, after the Safir and Simorgh. It is road mobile, requires very little fueling time, and can be launched by Transporter-Erector Launchers (TELs), raising alarms from US and EU European defense analysts about its possible covert nature as Iran's first IRBM.

Launch History

Gallery

See also 

 Iranian Space Agency
 Semnan Space Center
Other Iranian satellite launch vehicles
 Safir (rocket)
 Simorgh (rocket)
Qased (rocket)
Qaem-100 (rocket)

References

Space launch vehicles of Iran
Space program of Iran